Shënkoll may refer to:

Shënkoll, a village in the Lezhë municipality, Albania
Shënkoll, Baldushk, a village in the administrative unit of Baldushk, Tirana municipality, Albania
Shënkoll, Petrelë, a village in the administrative unit of Petrelë, Tirana municipality, Albania
several churches dedicated to Saint Nicholas in Albania, see St. Nicholas Church#Albania